Karunamoyee Rani Rashmoni was an Indian Bengali historical drama television series which aired on Bengali Entertainment Channel Zee Bangla and is also available on the digital platform ZEE5.  It was premiered on 24 July 2017. The serial was earlier produced by Subrata Roy and then it was produced by Zee Bangla. It completed 1,000 episodes on its third birthday (24 July 2020) and 1,500 episodes on 26 December 2021. After a successful run of  years, Karunamoyee Rani Rashmoni went off-air on 13 February 2022.

The show starred Ditipriya Roy in the titular role as Rani Rashmoni, the deeply spiritual and liberal-minded "Rani" of 19th century. Gazi Abdun Noor and Gourab Chatterjee and among others. The show was received well by the audience.

On July 4, 2021, Rani Rashmoni's character came to end showcasing her death. The show got revamped into a new season titled "Karunamoyee Rani Rashmoni - Uttar Porbo"   focusing on the life of Ramakrishna Paramahamsa (portrayed by Sourav Saha) - his spiritual journey and marriage with holy mother Sarada Devi (portrayed by Sandipta Sen).

Plot 
Rani Rashmoni (best known for being the founder of the Dakshineswar Kali Temple and for her untamed zeal and fight against the aggression of the British East India Company in 19th century at Bengal) and narrates the events of her life, starting from her being a young girl of 11, named "Rani", residing with her Vaishnav father and aunt in her ancestral village Halisahar to marrying ‘Babu Rajchandra Das’ of Janbazar, Kolkata; and how she becomes an extraordinary woman fighting against all odds during the then British ruled patriarchal society. The show upholds the quest of her life with the backdrop of the famous "Marh" family of Janbazar.

Uttar Parba 

The story revolves around the life of Ramkrishna Paramhansha Dev and Sarada Devi and the backdrop of the Dakshineswar Temple and the 'Marh' family of Janbazar after Rani Rashmoni aka Ranima's death.

Cast

Main
 Ditipriya Roy as Rani Rashmoni  aka "Rani" aka "Rani maa"- The defendant woman and Rani maa of Janbazar, Rajchandra's wife.(2017-2021)
 Gazi Abdun Noor as Babu Raj chandra Das (Marh) of Janbazar - The wealthy and magnanimous Zamindar of Janbazar, Rashmoni's husband.(2017-2019) 
 Sourav Saha as Sri Sri Ramakrishna Paramahamsa Dev - an Indian mystic and saint of 19th century Bengal. He is believed to be an incarnation of Lord Vishnu himself.(2019–2022)  
 Swarnava Sanyal as Child Gadadhar/ Ramkrishna.(2018)
 Sandipta Sen as Sarada Devi - One of the notable woman saints and mystics of the nineteenth century and wife of Sri Sri Ramakrishna Paramahamsa Dev. She is believed to be an incarnation of Lakshmi Devi herself.(2021-2022) 
 Ayanna Chatterjee as child Saradamoni a.k.a Maa Sarada.(2021)
 Sampurna Mondal / Roshni Bhattacharya / Mimi Dutta  as Jagadamba Biswas (née Dasi) aka Khuki: Rajchandra and Rashmoni's youngest daughter, she is liberal minded, dedicated and fearless by nature;just like her mother Rani Rashmoni, Mathuramohon's second wife.(2018–2022) 
 Gourab Chatterjee as  Mathuramohan Biswas aka "Mathur" - Karunamoyee's husband and Raj Chandra, Rashmoni's youngest son-in-law. He became like a son to Rashmoni-Rajchandra that they never had biologically. After Karunamoyee's death, he married Jagadamba, her younger sister.(2018-2021) 
 Susmili Acharjee as  Kumudini  Biswas / Indumoti Biswas - wife of Dwarikanath Biswas and daughter-in-law to Jagadamba and Mathuramohan Biswas. She is strong willed, open minded and fearless by nature. Her actions often represents her grandmother-in-law Rani Rashmoni. (2021–2022) 
 Nilotpal Banerjee / Suman Dey as  Dwarikanath Biswas, eldest son of Jagadamba Dasi and Mathuramohan Biswas, grandson of Rani Rashmoni. He was a devotee of Sri Sri Ramakrishna Paramhansa Dev and helped his mother Jagadamba Dasi in constructing the Annapurna Temple.(2019–2022)

Recurring 
 Sohan Bandopadhyay as Pritoram Das (Marh) - Jogmaya's husband, Raj Chandra's father and Rashmoni's father-in-law.(2017-2018)
 Samata Das as Jogmaya Dasi aka "Maya" / "Jugi" - Jugal Manna's daughter, Pritoram Marh's wife, Raj Chandra's mother and Rashmoni's mother-in-law.(2017-2018) 
 Suchandra Banerjee as Sukumari Dasi - Pritoram's youngest brother Kaliprasad's wife, sister-in-law of Jogmaya Dasi, Rajchandra's aunt, Abhay's mother. She is wicked and is greedy for wealth and wants her grandson Madhab to inherit Raj Chandra's property.(2017-2019)
 Indrajit Deb as Jugal Manna Das - Jogmaya's father and Raj Chandra's maternal grandfather (2017-2018) 
 Runa Bandyopadhyay as Raj Chandra's elder grandaunt (2017-2018) 
 Tania Kar as Aanandamayee Dasi - Elder sister-in-law of Rashmoni, widowed at young age.(2017-2019) 
 Dhrubajyoti Sarkar / Sudeep Raha as Abhay Chandra Das - Kaliprasad and Sukumari's son, Raj Chandra's younger cousin, Rashmoni's younger brother-in-law, Madhab's father. (2017-2019)
 Ashmita Chakraborty as Abhay's second wife. (2018-2019) 
 Shyamoupti Mudly / Ipshita Mukherjee as Sarajoo - Abhay's first wife, Rashmoni's younger sister-in-law, Madhab's mother who later left her husband because of his wickedness.(2017-2019) 
 Diya Chakrabarty as Padmamoni Ata (née Dasi) aka "Padma" - Raj Chandra-Rashmoni's eldest daughter, Ram Chandra's wife.(2018–2022) 
 Chandraniv Mukherjee / Saurav Chakraborty as Ram Chandra Ata aka "Atamoshai" - Padma's husband, Raj Chandra-Rashmoni's eldest son-in-law.(2018-2022) 
 Saheli Ghosh Roy / Ashmee Ghosh as Kumari Choudhury (née Dasi) - Raj Chandra-Rashmoni's second daughter, Pyarimohan's wife.(2018-2019) 
 Parthiv Banerjee as Pyarimohan Choudhury - Kumari's husband, Raj Chandra-Rashmoni's second son-in-law.(2018-2019) 
 Oindrila Saha as Karunamoyee Biswas (née Dasi) aka "Karuna" - Raj Chandra-Rashmoni's third daughter, Mathuramohan's first  wife who died after giving birth to her child, Bhupal.(2018) 
 Pritam Das as Madhab Chandra Das - Abhay and Saraju's son, Raj Chandra-Rashmoni's nephew, Sukumari's grandson, Padma's younger cousin brother, Kumari-Karuna-Jagadamba's elder cousin brother. He was a man of virtue in spite of his father and grandmother's continuous evil opinions.(2018-2019) 
 Sayak Chakraborty as Mahendra Das aka Mohen, eldest son of Padmamani Dasi and Ramchandra Ata, grandson of Rani Rashmoni.(2019-2020) 
 Subhrojit Saha as Jadunath Choudhury aka Jadu, son of Kumari Dasi, grandson of Rani Rashmoni.(2019-2020) 
 Biswabasu Biswas as Bhupal Chandra Biswas, son of Mathuramohan Biswas and his first wife Karunamoyee Dasi, grandson of Rani Rashmoni.(2019-2021) 
 Somashri Bhattacharya as Prasannamoyee Dasi aka Prasanno, wife of Bhupal Chandra, eldest daughter-in-law to Jagadamba Dasi and Mathuramohan Biswas.(2019-2021)
 Beas Dhar as Nistarini Biswas- Mathur Babu and Jagadamba Dasi's daughter.(2019-2020) 
 Alokananda Guha as Ashalata, first wife of Jadunath, daughter-in-law of Kumari Dasi and Pyarimohan Choudhury.(2019) 
 Aniket Chakraborty / Arunava Dey  as Trailokyanath Biswas aka Trailokyo, second son of Mathur Babu and Jagadamba Dasi.(2019–2022) 
 Poonam Basak as Kanaklata Biswas aka Konok, Trailokyonath's first wife, Jagadamba and Mathur's daughter in law.(2021–2022) 
 Deerghoi Paul as Subhasini Biswas aka Subhash, Trailokyonath's second wife, Jagadamba and Mathur's daughter in law.(2021–2022) 
 Soumi Chakraborty as Kamala, wife of Mahendranath, eldest daughter-in-law to Padmamani Dasi and Ramchandra Ata. (2019–2022) 
 Amitava Das as Raghabendra, He married the widow of Mahendranath, Kamala.(2020-2022) 
 Pronnoy Chandra / Koushik Das as Ganesh Chandra Ata, youngest son of Padmamani Dashi and Ramchandra Ata.(2020–2022)
 Promita Chakraborty as Annada, wife of Ganesh Chandra.(2020–2022) 
 Sujoy Saha as Doyal, Nistarini's husband.(2021) 
 Aritra Dutta  as Dhiren, Doyal's elder cousin brother.(2021)
 Arghya Mukherjee as Dhiren's father.(2021) 
 Sahana Sen as Dhiren's mother.(2021)
 Prantik Banerjee as Prankrishna Biswas - Mathur's elder brother, previously engaged to Karuna, Manmohini's husband.(2018-2019)
 Soumi Ghosh as Manmohini Biswas - Prankrishna's wife.(2019)
 Diganta Bagchi as Joy Narayan Biswas - Prankrishna and Mathuramohan's father, he is egoistic and estranged Mathur as a son owing to his ego as Mathur married Karuna without his permit. He is the Zamindar of Bitarit village.(2019) 
 Shankar Debnath as Harekrishna - Rashmoni's father.(2017) 
 Suchandrima as Khemankari Devi, Harekrishna's younger sister, Rashmoni's paternal aunt who raised her.(2017) 
 Manoj Ojha as Ramkumar Chattopadhyay, elder brother of Gadadhar, and the former chief priest of Dakshineswar Kali Temple.(2019-2020) 
 Twarita Chatterjee as Shyama: mother of Saradamoni.(2021) 
 Shaktipada Dey as Haladhari Thakur.(2020–2022) 
 Siddhartha Ghosh as Hriday Thakur.(2019–2022)
 Sujata Dawn / Lopamudra Sinha as Late Chandramani Devi - Shri Ramakrishna's mother.(2021–2022) 
 Aditya Roy as Rameshwar - Shri Ramakrishna's second elder brother(2020-2021)
 Kanyakumari Mukherjee / Prarona Bhattacharya as  Shibani - Rameshwar's wife  Shri Ramakrishna's second elder sister-in-law.(2020-2021) 
 Bhaswar Chatterjee as Khudiram Chattopadhyay - Shri Ramakrishna's father, a priest.(2018) 
 Aditi Chatterjee as Bhairavi Brahmani (or Yogeshwari) - a Yogeshwari who initiated Ramakrishna into Tantra.(2021)
 Anindita Bhattacharya / Tanushree Bhattacharya Bose / Sargami Rumpa as the divine goddess Bhabotarini: Annapurna a form of Bhabotarini- Janbazar's house's and Dakshineshwar temple's respected goddess.(2018–2022)
 Biswanath Basu as Nagen Choudhury. (2021-2022) 
 Diya Mukherjee as Binodini Dasi (2022)
 Subhrajit Dutta as Girish Chandra Ghosh  (2022)
 Subhajit Banerjee as Robin Saheb.(2021) 
 Indrakshi Nag as Jogendramohini Dasi aka Jogen : Comes in Dakshineshwar to give puja to Maa Bhabotarini.(2021)
 Avrajit Chakraborty as Agnikacharan: Jogendramohini's husband.(2021)
 Sanghita Ghosh as Moynaboti: a girl who come to meet with Ramkrishna.(2021–2022)
 Sandip Dey as Rudreshwar Bhairav.(2021) 
 Dedipya Ganguly as Bishtucharan.(2021)
 Kaushambi Chakraborty  as Maa Mahakali : A form of Maa Bhabatarini.(2021)
 Arindol Bagchi as Haran Thakur.(2020–2022) 
 Rahul Chakraborty as Jotadhari Baba: Gurudeb.(2021)
 Aishwarya Roy as Maa Kali disguised as a child.(2017-2019)
 Hiya Dey as Maa kali: Form of Maa Bhabatarini.(2018)
 Rupsha Chatterjee as Lusa Donald: Memsaheb.(2018)
 Ishani Sengupta as Durga: A resident of Mukimpur.(2017-2018)
 Sayan Karmakar as English Man. (2019) 
 Partha Sarathi Deb as Gurudev of Janbazar house.(2020)
 Samadipta Mukherjee as Rupmatibai: Came in Janbazar's house to sing.(2021)
 Shamik Chakraborty as Meghnath Upadhayaya.(2020)
 Goutam Dey as Bachaspati Mahashoy - Head of contemporary (orthodox) Brahmin society of early 19th century Bengal.(2019)
 Barun Chanda as Aghor Shastri Mahashoy - Former Head of contemporary Brahmin society of early 19th century Bengal, orthodox in mindset.(2017-2018)
 Jagriti Goswami as mother of Kalimoti.(2020)
 Sanjib Sarkar as Tarkalankar Mahashoy - Head of contemporary Brahmin society after Bachaspati Mahashoy's demise. He is an orthodox Hindu and has strained relations with Marh family over frequent disputes.(2019-2020)
 Joyjit Banerjee as Donald Saheb(2020)
 Anindita Raychaudhury as Champabai (2020)
 Fahim Mirza as Ram Mohan Roy(2018-2019)
 Raj Bhattacharya as Dwarkanath Tagore(2018)
 Sourav Chatterjee as Radhakanta Deb (2018-2019)
 Sourav Das as Ishwar Chandra Vidyasagar (2018-2020)
 Kaushik Banerjee as Sabarna Roy Choudhury(2020)
 Debopriyo Mukherjee as Michael Madhusudan Dutt (2022)
 Sumit Samaddar as Thuggee(2018)
 Juiee Sarkar as Napit Bou (2018)
 Rita Dutta Chakraborty as Kapalika (2019)
 Neil Chatterjee as Samuel: English Man (2018)
 Subhra Sourav Das as Anmary Saheb: English Man.(2018)
 Shirsha Guhathakurta as Kusum Dasi -  the young widow. Her father was a doctor (Boddimoshai) who saved the life of Jagadamba when she became ill during a widespread famine. Madhab has a soft corner for Kusum and wants to marry her.(2019)
 Arindam Ganguly as Nidhu Babu, the famous Tappa singer.(2018)

Reception
In week 50 of 2020, the series has risen to fifth place with 4.701 million impressions for the most watched television series in Bengal.

References

External links 

 Karunamoyee Rani Rashmoni at ZEE5
 

Bengali-language television programming in India
Zee Bangla original programming
2017 Indian television series debuts
Indian drama television series
2022 Indian television series endings